Ab Pakhshan (also Romanized as Āb Pakhshān; also known as Āb Pakhshūn) is a village in Javid-e Mahuri Rural District, in the Central District of Mamasani County, Fars Province, Iran. At the 2006 census, its population was 755, in 160 families.

References 

Populated places in Mamasani County